The 2nd Mechanized Infantry Division is a division of the Hellenic Army.

History 
The 2nd Infantry Division was established in the aftermath of the disastrous Greco-Turkish War of 1897 by Royal Decree on 24 October 1897. Based at Athens, it comprised the 3rd Infantry Brigade at with 1st and 7th Infantry Regiments, and the 4th Infantry Brigade with 8th and 9th Infantry Regiments. The two existing divisions were then abolished on 1 August 1900 as part of a general restructuring, and three new divisions were ordered established a month later. 2nd Division, still at Athens, now comprised 3rd Brigade (Athens) with the 1st and 7th Regiments, and 4th Brigade (Chalkis) with the 2nd and 5th Infantry Regiments, as well as the 2nd Cavalry Regiment, the 2nd Artillery Regiment, and the 2nd Evzone Battalion.

On 9 September 1904, as part of another reorganization, the 4th Brigade was moved to Nafplio and now comprised the 8th and 11th Regiments, while the 3rd Brigade remained as it was. In addition, the division now comprised the 1st and 2nd Evzone Battalions, the 2nd Cavalry Regiment, 2nd Field Artillery Regiment, 2nd Engineers Battalion, 2nd Train Company and 2nd Nursing Company, and the 2nd Military Music Command. Most of these support units were based at Athens.

In January 1912, the brigades were abolished and divisions organized as triangular divisions. The Division remained at Athens, but now comprised 1st and 7th Regiments at Athens and the 3rd Infantry Regiment at Chalkis, plus supporting units.

In 1998, the division was directly subordinate to the II Army Corps. It comprised the 33rd and 34th Brigades, both mechanised. Both were equipped with M-113s and Leopard MBTs. In 2014 the 24th Armored Brigade was transferred to the 2nd Mechanized Infantry Division, which in its current form with three brigades is the strategic reserve of the Hellenic Army.

Structure

 II Mechanised Infantry Division (II Μ/Κ ΜΠ) based at Edessa, organised into:
 Division HQ Company (ΛΣ/ΙΙ Μ/Κ ΜΠ)
 Division Artillery Command (ΔΠΒ/ΙΙ Μ/Κ ΜΠ)
 2nd Signal Company (2ο ΤΔΒ)
  24th Armoured Brigade, based at Litochoro
  33rd Mechanized Infantry Brigade, based at Polykastro
  34th Mechanized Infantry Brigade, based at Giannitsa

References

Mechanized infantry divisions of Greece
1897 establishments in Greece
Military units and formations established in 1897